Lee Powell may refer to:
Lee Powell (actor) (1908–1944), U.S. film actor
Lee Powell (footballer) (born 1973), Welsh footballer

See also
Lee Howells (born 1968), British footballer and manager
Les Powell (disambiguation)
Lew Powell ( 1974–2012), an American journalist, author, and newspaper editor
Powell v Lee (1908), an English contract law case